Igreja de Nossa Senhora da Conceição was a church in Luanda, Angola. 

Founded in 1583, it was the first Parish Church of Luanda, and was originally made from wooden pillars, plaster and mud, with a thatched roof. In 1653, work began on building a stronger church and it became the cathedral of the city until 1818, when it was replaced with Nossa Senhora do Carmo 

References

Roman Catholic churches in Luanda
Roman Catholic churches completed in 1583
Roman Catholic churches completed in 1653
1583 establishments in Africa
16th-century Roman Catholic church buildings in Angola